Assurance may refer to:
 Assurance (computer networking)
 Assurance (theology), a Protestant Christian doctrine
 Assurance services, offered by accountancy firms
 Life assurance, an insurance on human life
 Quality assurance
 Assurance IQ, Inc., a subsidiary of Prudential Financial

Places
Assurance, West Virginia, an unincorporated community in the United States
 Mount Assurance, New Hampshire, United States

Ships

See also 

 Insurance